Lysorophus is a genus of Lysorophia, extinct Permian Lepospondyl tetrapods. Most of the specimens are found from North America and attributed to the first formally described species Lysorophus tricarinatus due to the lack of diagnostic characters, but several other species have been described. Lysorophus were small salamander-like amphibians. They lived in fresh water, aestivating in burrows during dry periods.

References

Lysorophians
Permian amphibians
Permian amphibians of North America
Taxa named by Edward Drinker Cope
Fossil taxa described in 1877